Sandra Peuler is a judge of the Utah Third District Court in Salt Lake City. She was appointed to the bench by former Governor Michael O. Leavitt.  She served as Chief Judge of the court from 2001 to 2007.

Peuler holds a J.D. from the University of Baltimore.

References

Year of birth missing (living people)
Living people
University of Louisiana at Lafayette alumni
University of Baltimore School of Law alumni
Utah state court judges
American women judges
21st-century American women